Kreamer may refer to:

Kreamer, Pennsylvania, a census-designated place in  Middlecreek Township, Snyder County, Pennsylvania, United States
Kreamer Island, an island in Lake Okeechobee, Palm Beach County, Florida, United States

People with the surname
Anne Kreamer (born 1955), American journalist
Barbara Osborn Kreamer (born 1948), American politician

See also
Krämer